Oregovomab (marketed under the trade name OvaRex) is a mouse monoclonal antibody it binds to the antigen CA125, a carbohydrate antigen. It is designed for the treatment of ovarian cancer.

This drug was developed by AltaRex Corp.

References

Monoclonal antibodies for tumors
Experimental cancer drugs